The 2014–15 Estonian Cup was the 25th season of the Estonia's most prestigious football knockout tournament. 
The defending champions Levadia were eliminated after a walkover loss against 4 tier club in the third round as they fielded an unregistered player. Nõmme Kalju won their first title and qualified for the first qualifying round of the UEFA Europa League.

First round
The draw was made by Estonian Football Association on 17 May 2014, before the 2013–14 final of the same competition. League level of the club in the brackets. Rahvaliiga (RL) is a league organized by Estonian Football Association, but not part of the main league system.

Notes
Note 1:  withdrew from the competition.
Note 2: FC Vinni withdrew from the competition.
Note 3: Vutihoolikud withdrew from the competition.

Byes
These teams were not drawn and secured a place in the second round without playing:
 Meistriliiga (Level 1): Tallinna FC Levadia, Nõmme Kalju FC, Paide Linnameeskond
 Esiliiga (2): Kiviõli FC Irbis, Tallinna FC Puuma
 Esiliiga B (3): Tallinna FC Flora III, FC Elva
 II Liiga (4): JK Welco Elekter, SK Noorus 96 Jõgeva, JK Visadus, Lasnamäe FC Ajax
 III Liiga (5): IAFA Estonia, Ambla Vallameeskond, Rapla JK Atli, Valga FC Warrior, FC Otepää, Navi Vutiselts, FC Kose
 IV Liiga (6): SK Tapa, FC Soccernet, Tallinna FC Reaal, FCF Tallinna Ülikool II
 Rahvaliiga (RL): –

Second round
The draw for the second round was made on 12 June. 

Notes
Note 4: IAFA Estonia withdrew from the competition.

Third round
The draw for the third round was made on 18 July.

Note 5: Saue Laagri were awarded a win as Levadia fielded an unregistered player.

Fourth round
The draw for the fourth round was made on 21 August.

Note 6: Kiviõli FC Irbis withdrew from the competition.

Quarter-finals
The draw was made on 2 March 2015.

Semi-finals
The draw was made on 30 April 2015.

Final

See also
 2014 Meistriliiga
 2014 Esiliiga
 2014 Esiliiga B

References

External links
 Official website 

Estonian Cup seasons
Cup
Cup
Estonian